Go Now and Live is the second full-length studio album by English post-hardcore band We Are the Ocean, released on 25 April 2011. The album was produced by Pete Miles (The King Blues, Canterbury) and released through Hassle Records.

Two singles were released prior to the release of the album: "What It Feels Like" on 4 January 2011, and "The Waiting Room" on 18 April 2011. The music video of "What It Feels Like" premiered on 8 February 2011, while the music video for "The Waiting Room" premiered on 21 March 2011. Runaway was the third single to be released.

Reception

Go Now and Live has received mixed to positive reviews from music critics upon its release. At Metacritic, which assigns a normalized rating out of 100 to reviews from mainstream critics, the album received an average score of 59, based on 5 reviews, which indicates "mixed or average reviews".

Track listing

Charts

Personnel 
We Are The Ocean
 Dan Brown – vocals
 Liam Cromby – vocals, rhythm guitar
 Alfie Scully – lead guitar
 Jack Spence  – bass guitar
 Tom Whittaker – drums, percussion

Additional personnel
 Pete Miles - producer

References

2011 albums
We Are the Ocean albums
Hassle Records albums